The Monte Capezzone (in Titzschu Jungebärg) is a mountain in the Pennine Alps of north-western Italy; with an elevation of  is the highest peak of the Strona Valley.

Geography 

The mountain is located at the tripoint between three valleys: Valstrona, Valle Anzasca and Valle Mastallone (the latter a side valley of Valsesia). The Sesia/Anzasca wayer divide goes on westwards with Monte Mora and Cima Cresta . From the summit of Monte Capezzone starts the dividing range between Val Strona and Val Mastallone which, heading South, after the Colle della Crocetta and the Cima Lago reaches the Altemberg (Alpi Cusiane). Estwards the water divide between the valleys of the Strona and the  Anza heads towards the Monte Massone.  Administratively the summit of Monte Capezzone is the tripoint where the borders of the comunes of Rimella (VC), Calasca-Castiglione (VB) and Valstrona (VB) meet. Close to the main elevation of the mountain stands a cross.

SOIUSA classification 
According to the SOIUSA (International Standardized Mountain Subdivision of the Alps) the mountain can be classified in the following way:
 main part = Western Alps
 major sector = North Western Alps
 section = Pennine Alps
 subsection = Eastern Aosta and Northern Valsesia Alps
 supergroup = Contrafforti valsesiani del Monte Rosa
 group = Costiera Punta Grober-Tagliaferro-Montevecchio
 subgroup = Contrafforte Montevecchio-Quarazzola-Capezzone
 code = I/B-9.III-C.7.b/b

Geology 
At the foot of the Capezzone a geologic survey discovered gold mineralizations embedded in schistose rock layers.

Access to the summit 

The summit of the Capezzone can be accessed starting from Campello Monti (a former autonomous comune now belonging to Valstrona). After the bivouac Abele Traglio, located on the Lake Capezzone shore, a waymarked track reaches the Colle della Crocetta saddle and, turning right, climbs the Sesia/Stona ridge up to the summit cross. The Colle della Crocetta can also be reached from Rimella with an uneasy hiking itinerary.

Nature conservation 
The slopes of Monte Capezzone facing Valstrona and Valsesia are part of the regional park of Alta Val Sesia e dell'Alta Val Strona. The area is also preserved by the establishment of S.C.I. named "Campello Monti" (code IT1140003) and of a whider protected area named Alta Val Strona e la Val Segnara (code IT1140020).

Mountain huts
By the Lake Capezzone at  stands the Bivacco Abele Traglio, an unattended and always open mountain hut; in  Campello Monti, during the summer, can be used a posto tappa (simple accommodation) of the GTA.

Maps

References

Mountains of the Alps
Mountains of Piedmont
Pennine Alps
Two-thousanders of Italy